Skórzec  is a village in the administrative district of Gmina Skórzec, within Siedlce County, Mazowieckie Voivodeship, in eastern Poland.

The village has a population of 330.

References

Villages in Siedlce County